Springvale Junction is a particularly notorious road intersection in Melbourne. It is situated on the boundary of the suburbs of Mulgrave and Springvale.

Intersection
Springvale junction forms the intersection of four major roads, two of which terminate:
Springvale Road: along with Stud Road eight kilometres to the east and Warrigal Road four kilometres to the west, Springvale Road is the busiest and unsafe north-south thoroughfare in the eastern suburbs, with speed limits of 70 km/h and 80 km/h, and a six-lane dual carriageway.
Princes Highway: along with the Monash Freeway, the major thoroughfare from the south-eastern suburbs into the city, running northwest-southeast. Like Springvale road, a six-lane dual carriageway.
Police Rd/Centre Rd: two-lane single carriageway running east-west. These roads are slightly off-set from the main intersection.
Each of the six main corners of the intersection has shops or shopping centres on it.

Problems
Springvale Junction is notorious for three reasons:
It is extremely slow during peak times. The combination of outbound traffic on Princes Highway, outbound traffic from Centre Road, and traffic going both directions on Springvale Road means that traffic jams are frequent, and waiting times on Princes Highway in particular are fifteen minutes or more. This can cause many Bus Routes such as the Smart Bus Route 902 to run behind timetable as there are no Bus Lanes
It is particularly confusing. With Police/Centre Rds slightly offset from the other two, Springvale Junction acts as three separate sets of traffic lights, with each road requiring two sets of right-turn lanes. In particular, south-bound Springvale Road traffic turning right into Princes Highway use the right-hand lane and turn on a right arrow; those turning right into Centre Road use the second lane from the right, advance on a green light, rather than a right arrow, and wait for a green arrow at the mid-intersection waiting point.
It is by far the worst blackspot intersection in Melbourne. With the improvements to St Kilda Junction and Flemington Junction, Springvale Junction now has the most accidents of any intersection in Melbourne. It is also a nightmare for both traffic and safety if the traffic lights at the intersection fails.

Improvements
The shopping centres make upgrades to Springvale Junction impossible. However, alternative thoroughfares have been built to ease the congestion:
The Monash Freeway takes much of the city traffic off Princes Highway.
The upgrade of Westall Road directs south-bound traffic from the west around Springvale Junction, and the slowest part of Springvale Road.
EastLink should take traffic off Springvale Road.
The Dingley Arterial, which connects with the existing Westall Road Extension attracts Dandenong traffic away from the junction.
Removing the railway crossing at Springvale to improve safety and punctuality with both road traffic and trains and therefore unclog Springvale Road.

See also

References 

Streets in Melbourne